Dubber is a cloud based call recording software which operates as a software-as-service (SaaS) and voice data offering. Dubber was founded in Melbourne, Australia in 2011 by James Slaney, Steve McGovern and Adrian Di Pietrantonio, and predominantly sells to Telecommunications Service Providers and Enterprise customers.

History 
In 2013 Dubber raised $6M in angel investment. In 2015, Dubber listed on the Australian Stock Exchange (ASX) under the code DUB.

In May 2015, Dubber passed a series of interoperability tests with BroadSoft's unified communications software. This combined solution allowed users to deploy call recording on top of their BroadSoft network without the need of any additional hardware. Following this news, in June 2015, Dubber announced growth of 141% in users for the first half of that year.

In 2016 Dubber announced a partnership with Cisco Broadsoft. A year later, in October of 2017, Cisco announced that they would acquire Broadsoft.   

Dubber’s technology is used by many large service providers and cloud communication and collaboration providers around the world to embed call recording and voice data services into their unified communication and other services, including AT&T,   IBM,  Optus,  Telstra,  Cox Communications,  Sprint,  the UK’s 02,  and others.

Technology 
Dubber's call recording and voice data solutions are natively hosted in the cloud, allowing its services to be embedded in third party telecommunication and cloud collaboration (UCaaS) solutions.   Dubber utilises API's to integrate call recording data into third party software and telecommunications services.

Dubber’s call recording services achieved certification for compliance call recording on Microsoft Teams, in February 2021.  

In April 2021, Dubber announced that its call recording and voice AI service would interoperate with Zoom and Zoom Phone.  

In June of 2021, Dubber launched its foundation partner program, a significant expansion of its product model whereby telecommunications carriers and UCaaS services can embed the Dubber call recording service in all user accounts.  Cisco Webex Calling and Cisco Unified Communications Manager Cloud (UCM) were the first such services launched on the program. 

On 2 Dec 2021, the company announced an agreement with BT (formerly British Telecom) whereby BT would use Dubber as their default recording and conversational solution in the BT Meetings suite of managed services, including Microsoft Teams, Cisco Webex Calling and Zoom Phone.  

On 13 December 2021, Dubber and Optus announced that they would include the Dubber platform on the Optus Mobile network to provide the Dubber platform for enterprise customers in Australia.

Acquisitions 

Dubber announced its first acquisition in May of 2020, acquiring Australian-based on-premise call recording company CallN.  CallN was previously partly owned by Telstra.  

Dubber acquired UK based Speik, a leading provider of PCI compliance and call recording solutions in the UK in December of 2020 for A$38 million. 

In September of 2021, Dubber announced that it had acquired Brisbane, Australia based Notiv, a developer of cloud-native AI-based products that turn meetings into transcribed notes, summaries, signals, and other actions.

References

External links 
Official Company Website

Companies established in 2011
Call-recording software
Technology companies of Australia